Ås is a locality situated in Nora Municipality, Örebro County, Sweden with 499 inhabitants in 2010.

References 

Populated places in Örebro County
Populated places in Nora Municipality